Brackenthwaite may refer to the following places in England: